Chittattukara is a census town and panchayat in Paravur Taluk of Ernakulam District, Kerala. Paravur town is situated close to this village, just 2 km.  The most ancient and trade centre Pashnam is located at Pattanam, a small area in this village.  Many historic monuments were founded out from this area.

History
Chittattukara was carved out from Vadakkekara village union. The panchayat was full of lush green trees and canals. People settled here according to the caste hierarchy.

Religion
Temples
 Mannam Subrahmanya temple (Biggest Kavadi in District)
 Makkanayi Siva Temple
 Neendoor Temple
 Kalarikkal Temple
 Guruthippadam Temple, Parayakad    
 Neeleswaram Mahadeva Temple, Pttanam, North Paravoor    
 Thrikkeparambu bhagavathi temple 
 Chekuthanthara Panikarachan Badrakaali Devi Temple, Pooyappilly, North Paravur        
Mosques
 Jaram 
 Neendor Chittatukara Juma Masjid
 Parappuram Juma Masjid
Churches
 St. Sebastian's Church

See also
 Paravur Taluk
 Ernakulam District

References 

Villages in Ernakulam district